Tangipahoa Parish (French: Paroisse de Tangipahoa) is a parish located on the southeast border of the U.S. state of Louisiana. As of the 2020 census, the population was 133,157. The parish seat is Amite City, while the largest city is Hammond. Southeastern Louisiana University is located in Hammond. Lake Pontchartrain borders the southeast side of the parish.

The name Tangipahoa comes from an Acolapissa word meaning "ear of corn" or "those who gather corn." The parish was organized in 1869 during the Reconstruction era.

Tangipahoa Parish comprises the Hammond, LA Metropolitan Statistical Area, which is also included in the New Orleans-Metairie-Hammond, LA-MS Combined Statistical Area. It is one of what are called the Florida Parishes, at one time part of West Florida.

History

Tangipahoa Parish was created by Louisiana Act 85 on March 6, 1869, during the Reconstruction era. The parish was assembled from territories taken from Livingston Parish, St. Helena Parish, St. Tammany Parish, and Washington Parish. It was named after the Tangipahoa River and the historic Tangipahoa Native American people of this area. Tangipahoa is the youngest parish in the Florida Parishes region of southern Louisiana.

Parts of this area had already been developed for sugar cane plantations when the parish was organized, and that industry depended on numerous African American laborers who were freedmen after the war. Mostly white yeomen farmers occupied areas in the piney woods and resisted planters' attempts at political dominance. African Americans comprised about one-quarter of the population overall in the Florida Parishes before the war but were prevalent in the plantation areas, where they had been enslaved laborers.

The region developed rapidly during and after Reconstruction. Both physical and political conflicts arose in Tangipahoa Parish among interests related to construction of railroads, exploitation of timber, yeoman farmers in the piney woods keeping truck farms, and the beginning of manufacturing. 

Sugar cane had depended on the labor of large gangs of enslaved African Americans before the Civil War. After the war and emancipation, some freedmen stayed to work on the plantations as laborers. Others moved to New Orleans and other cities, seeking different work. This area had rapid development and received a high rate of immigrants and migrants from other areas of the country. Through the turn of the twentieth century, the eastern Florida Parishes had the most white mob violence and highest rate of lynchings (primarily of black men) in southern Louisiana.

Especially after Reconstruction, whites helped black communities with flowers and food. Piney woods whites resisted the planters' efforts to restore their political power, but imposed their own brutal violence on freedmen. 

Tangipahoa Parish became more socially volatile by a "pronounced in-migration" of northerners (from the Midwest) and Sicilian immigrants, coupled with "industrial development along the Illinois Central Railroad, and crippling political factionalism."

During the period of 1877–1950, a total of 24 blacks were lynched by whites in the parish as a means of racial terrorism and intimidation. This was the sixth highest total of any parish in Louisiana and the highest number of any parish in southern Louisiana. Twenty-two of these murders took place from 1879 to 1919, a time of heightened violence in the state. Unlike some other parishes, Tangipahoa did not have a high rate of legal executions of blacks; the whites operated outside the justice system altogether. Among those lynched and hanged by a mob was Emma Hooper, a black woman who had shot and wounded a constable.

In 1898 the Louisiana state legislature disenfranchised most blacks by raising barriers to voter registration. They effectively excluded blacks from politics for decades, until after passage and enforcement of federal civil rights legislation. 

In the first half of the 20th century, many African Americans left Tangipahoa Parish to escape the racial violence and oppression of Jim Crow, moving to industrial cities in the Great Migration. Especially during and after World War II, they moved to the West Coast, where the buildup of the defense industry opened up new jobs. In the 21st century, blacks constitute a minority in the parish.

Timber, agriculture and industry are still important to the parish. It suffered flooding in 1932 and in the early 1980s. In 2016, Tangipahoa was one of many parishes declared a Federal disaster area due to historic flooding from rainfall and storms in both March and August.

Geography
Lake Pontchartrain lies on the southeast side of the parish.

Most of the parish south of Ponchatoula consists of Holocene coastal swamp and marsh—gray-to-black clays of high organic content and thick peat beds underlying freshwater marsh and swamp.

Adjacent counties and parishes
 Amite County, Mississippi  (northwest)
 Pike County, Mississippi  (northeast)
 St. Tammany Parish (east)
 Washington Parish (east)
 St. John the Baptist Parish  (south)
 Livingston Parish (west)
 St. Helena Parish  (west)

Transportation

Railroads

Amtrak's daily City of New Orleans long-distance train stops in Hammond, both northbound (to Chicago) and southbound. It serves about 15,000 riders a year, and Hammond-Chicago is the ninth-busiest city pair on the route.

The historic main line of the Illinois Central that carries freight through the parish is now part of CN. It continues to be busy.

Highways

  Interstate 12
  Interstate 55
  U.S. Route 51
  U.S. Route 190
  Louisiana Highway 10
  Louisiana Highway 16
  Louisiana Highway 22
  Louisiana Highway 38
  Louisiana Highway 40
  Louisiana Highway 440
  Louisiana Highway 442
  Louisiana Highway 443
  Louisiana Highway 445
  Louisiana Highway 1040
  Louisiana Highway 1045
  Louisiana Highway 1046
  Louisiana Highway 1048
  Louisiana Highway 1049
  Louisiana Highway 1050
  Louisiana Highway 1051
  Louisiana Highway 1053
  Louisiana Highway 1054
  Louisiana Highway 1055
  Louisiana Highway 1056
  Louisiana Highway 1057
  Louisiana Highway 1061
  Louisiana Highway 1062
  Louisiana Highway 1063
  Louisiana Highway 1064
  Louisiana Highway 1065
  Louisiana Highway 1067
  Louisiana Highway 1249
  Louisiana Highway 3158
  Louisiana Highway 3234
  Louisiana Highway 3260

Demographics

As of the 2020 United States census, there were 133,157 people, 46,526 households, and 31,420 families residing in the parish.

As of the census of 2000, there were 100,588 people, 36,558 households, and 25,773 families residing in the parish. The population density was 127 people per square mile (49/km2).  There were 40,794 housing units at an average density of 52 per square mile (20/km2).  The racial makeup of the parish was 69.76% White, 28.35% Black or African American, 0.39% Asian, 0.24% Native American, 0.01% Pacific Islander, 0.46% from other races, and 0.78% from two or more races.  1.53% of the population were Hispanic or Latino of any race.

There were 36,558 households, out of which 35.30% had children under the age of 18 living with them, 49.90% were married couples living together, 16.20% had a female householder with no husband present, and 29.50% were non-families. 24.00% of all households were made up of individuals, and 8.40% had someone living alone who was 65 years of age or older.  The average household size was 2.66 and the average family size was 3.19.

In the parish the population was spread out, with 27.70% under the age of 18, 12.70% from 18 to 24, 27.70% from 25 to 44, 21.20% from 45 to 64, and 10.60% who were 65 years of age or older.  The median age was 32 years. For every 100 females there were 93.00 males.  For every 100 females age 18 and over, there were 88.60 males.

The median income for a household in the parish was $29,412, and the median income for a family was $36,731. Males had a median income of $31,576 versus $20,066 for females. The per capita income for the parish was $14,461.  About 18.00% of families and 22.70% of the population were below the poverty line, including 28.60% of those under age 18 and 20.10% of those age 65 or over.

Government and politics

The parish is part of both Louisiana's 1st congressional district and Louisiana's 5th congressional district. Since the late 20th century most of the conservative, white-majority voters have left the Democratic Party and shifted to the Republican Party. African Americans have largely continued to support the Democratic Party and its candidates.

The parish government is governed by the Louisiana State Constitution and the Tangipahoa Parish Home Rule Charter. The Parish Government of Tangipahoa is headed by a parish president and a parish council (president-council government). The council is the legislative body of the parish, with authority under Louisiana State Constitution, the Parish Home Rule Charter, and laws passed by the Louisiana State Legislature.  The Parish Sheriff is the chief law enforcement officer; other elected officers include the coroner, assessor, and clerk of court.

Keith Bardwell, justice of the peace for the parish's 8th ward (Robert, Louisiana), attracted attention in October 2009 for refusing to officiate the wedding of an interracial couple. Bardwell, a justice of the peace for 34 years, had concluded that "most black society does not readily accept offspring of such relationships, and neither does white society". He said he does not perform weddings for interracial marriages because "I don't want to put children in a situation they didn't bring on themselves." Bardwell said he had refused to perform the weddings of four couples during the 2½-year period before the news of his actions was publicized, resigned effective November 3, 2009. Governor Bobby Jindal said that the resignation was "long overdue."

Parish officers
 Parish PresidentCharles Robert "Robby" Miller, Jr. (R), since 2016
 SheriffDaniel H. Edwards (D), since 2004
 Clerk of CourtGary Stanga (D), since 2017
 CoronerDr. Rick Foster (D), since 2000
 AssessorJoaquin "Junior" Matheu (D), since 2005

Parish Council
Tangipahoa Parish is governed by an elected ten-member Council, each representing a geographic district and roughly equal populations. As of October 2016 its chairman was Bobby Cortez. Kristen Pecararo is the clerk of the council.

The council members are:

District 1Trent Forrest (D) from Kentwood

District 2John Ingraffia (R) from Husser

District 3Louis Nick Joseph (D) from Independence

District 4Carlo S. Bruno (R) from Independence

District 5H. G. "Buddy" Ridgel (D) from Hammond

District 6Emile "Joey" Mayeaux (R) from Hammond

District 7Lionell Wells (D) from Hammond

District 8David Vial (R) from Hammond

District 9Brigette Delatte Hyde (R) from Ponchatoula

District 10Kim Landry Coates (R) from Hammond

President of Tangipahoa Parish
In 1986, the former governing body of Tangipahoa Parish, the Tangipahoa Police Jury, and the voters of the Parish approved a "home rule charter" style of government. The charter provided for the election of a parish president, essentially a parish-wide mayor. Democrat Gordon A. Burgess was elected to an initial one-year term and re-elected the following year for a four-year term. Burgess was repeatedly re-elected as parish president until he retired in 2015.

In 2016, Republican businessman Robert "Robby" Miller succeeded Burgess. In April 2016, the Parish hired its first chief administrative officer, Shelby "Joe" Thomas, Jr. to handle operating functions.

Law enforcement
The Tangipahoa Parish Sheriff's Office is headquartered in Hammond. The Sheriff's office was excluded from a DEA task force in 2016 after the Justice Department charged two deputies with stealing money and drugs seized in raids.

The office maintains:
 a uniformed patrol unit
 a SWAT unit, called the "Special Response Team."
 a police-dog unit
 a mounted unit
 a system of reserve deputies 
 the parish's jail

Education
The parish is served by the Tangipahoa Parish School System. Southeastern Louisiana University is located in Hammond.

On seven occasions, the American Civil Liberties Union has sued the Tangipahoa Parish School Board, along with other defendants, for having allegedly sponsored and promoted religion in teacher-led school activities.

School Board
The elected school board governs and oversees the Tangipahoa Parish School System (TPSS). The board appoints the superintendent of schools, who leads the school system and oversees is functioning. The current superintendent is Melissa M. Stilley. The president of the board is Sandra Bailey-Simmons, and the vice president is Tom Tolar.

Melissa M. Stilley, superintendent

Janice Fultz Richards (D), District A

Tom Tolar (R), District B

Robin Abrams (R), District C

Glenn Westmoreland (R), District D

Brett Duncan (I), District E

Randy Bush (R), District F

Jerry Moore (D), District G

Sandra Bailey-Simmons (R), District H

Rose Quave Dominguez (R), District I

The Board has a long history of racial discrimination in the hiring of teachers. In 1975, it was ordered to ensure one-third of the teaching staff were Black. Both the Board and the Court ignored the mandate for more than thirty years. During the period from 1998 to 2008, the Board hired fewer Black teachers than any other school system in the state. In 2010, a second ruling strengthened the first.

National Guard
The parish is home to the 204th Theater Airfield Operations Group and the Forward Support Company of the 205th Engineer Battalion.  This 205th Engineer Battalion is a component of the 225th Engineer Brigade of the Louisiana National Guard.  These units reside within the city of Hammond. A detachment of the 1021st Engineer Company (Vertical) resides in Independence, Louisiana.  The 236th Combat Communications Squadron of the Louisiana Air National Guard also resides at the Hammond Airport.

Communities

Cities 
 Hammond (largest municipality)
 Ponchatoula

Towns
 Amite City (parish seat)
 Independence
 Kentwood
 Roseland

Villages
 Tangipahoa
 Tickfaw

Census-designated place
 Natalbany

Other unincorporated places

 Baptist
 Fluker
 Husser
 Loranger
 Manchac (Akers)
 Pumpkin Center
 Robert
 Rosaryville
 Wilmer

Notable people
 Chris Broadwater, current District 86 state representative, resides in Hammond
 Nick Bruno, president of University of Louisiana at Monroe
 Hodding Carter, 20th-century journalist
 John L. Crain, president of Southeastern Louisiana University
 John Bel Edwards, current Governor of Louisiana; former Minority Leader of Louisiana House of Representatives; former District 72 state representative, resides in Amite
 Lucy Fleming, singer
 C. B. Forgotston, political activist
 Barbara Forrest, critic of intelligent design
 Tim Gautreaux, writer
 Dennis Paul Hebert, state representative for Tangipahoa Parish, 1972-1996
 Bolivar E. Kemp, U.S. representative, 1925–1933
 Bolivar Edwards Kemp, Jr., Louisiana Attorney General, 1948–1952
 Wade Miley, professional baseball pitcher
 James H. Morrison, represented Louisiana's 6th congressional district from 1943 to 1967
 Kim Mulkey, college basketball player, United States Olympic Team, Baylor head women's basketball coach
 Rufus Porter, professional football player
 Henry "Tank" Powell, state representative from 1996 to 2008
 Billy Reid, fashion designer
 Weldon Russell, former state representative from Tangipahoa and St. Helena parishes
 Jackie Smith, former professional football player, St. Louis Cardinals and Dallas Cowboys, NFL Hall of Famer
 Irma Thomas, Grammy-winning singer
 Harry D. Wilson, Louisiana state representative and state agriculture commissioner; pushed for the establishment of the town of Independence in 1912
 Justin Wilson, chef and humorist
 Robert Alford, professional football player, Atlanta Falcons, Arizona Cardinals
 Harlan Miller, professional football player, Arizona Cardinals, Washington Redskins
 Kevin Hughes, professional football player, St. Louis Rams and Carolina Panthers
 Donald Dykes, former professional football player, New York Jets and San Diego Chargers
 Earl Wilson, former major league baseball player for Boston Red Sox, Detroit Tigers and San Diego Padres
 LaBrandon Toefield, former professional football player, Jacksonville Jaguars and Carolina Panthers
Devonta Smith, professional football player, Philadelphia Eagles, 2020 Heisman Trophy Winner, Alabama Crimson Tide football.

See also

 National Register of Historic Places listings in Tangipahoa Parish, Louisiana
 Tangipahoa Parish Sheriff's Office

References

External links

 
 
 

 
1869 establishments in Louisiana
Louisiana parishes
Louisiana placenames of Native American origin
Populated places established in 1869
Southeastern Louisiana University
Swamps of Louisiana